Talnet is a Czech educational project that focuses on the development of gifted and motivated children. The mentioned project was established under the aegis of Charles University Prague and aims to educate extraordinarily gifted children in natural sciences. The theory is that talented children need individual treatment to identify themselves and develop their gifts. A program that would deal with these goals as needed. That's why the program Talnet creates a space in the online platform, where its students could meet, discuss the topics they've found interesting. In addition, such a possibility is there not only with the other Talnet students - with the experts as well. Talnet Space – an online platform of Talnet communication – lets connect students and pupils according to their goals and interests.

Talnet develops also a network among partners abroad and seeks other groups in the world which aims are similar to Talnet's one - the education of extraordinarily gifted students. The main effort is given to the students' meetings across boardings. Thus the meeting has two stages: at first, students explore online activities and learn communication, secondly they meet each other at interesting places of the connected countries.

Talnet aims also pupils', parents' and teachers' education. This way, Talnet helps them to find out the gift among all the pupils in the class and support them sufficiently. The organisation uses international knowledge and continues in well-known contests and activities specially prepared for students with natural science interests. Talnet cooperates with a group of psychologists, who at the beginning and during the pupils' online study watch the gifted young persons in their developing and consulate their personal problems with them.

What Talnet offers 

    "Talnet offers the whole structure of educational and exploring activities to children who are recommended by their teachers or psychologists. Activities differ in the topic, forms (face to face, blended, online) teaching approach, workload, complexity, and applicability. We prefer the active participation of children and youth in a rich learning environment according to the results of psycho-diagnostics tests.

Since the beginning of the project we have confirmed that many gifted children need more and more challenging, e.g. demanding and complex, activities. The level of challenge may be perceived in many different aspects such as subject, problem-solving, creativity, production and social aspects, etc. The main purpose of international activities is offering gifted youth further opportunities for the development of their competencies and extending the offer of authentic educational and social activities."

References

External links 

Charles University
Gifted education
Educational organizations based in the Czech Republic
2003 establishments in the Czech Republic